The Ashland Bus Rapid Transit is one of the planned bus rapid transit corridors in Chicago. The service will run on Ashland Avenue from Irving Park Road to 95th Street, a distance of approximately 17 miles.

The route would serve various destinations including the Illinois Medical District, the University of Illinois at Chicago, Malcolm X College, and the United Center.  It would also provide a connection to seven Chicago Transit Authority subway/elevated rail stations.

Buses would operate using an exclusive lane in the center of the street, with bus platforms located in the median.  The service would also utilize features such as transit signal priority and pre-paid fares.  CTA estimates that bus speeds on the Ashland BRT would be up to 83% faster than the existing local route.

History

Planning and public engagement were conducted throughout 2012 and 2013.  The project's Environmental Assessment was released in November 2013, finding no significant impacts.

The project has generated some opposition, due to concerns about impacts on automobile traffic and left-turn restrictions.  The CTA responded by agreeing to consider restoring some of the left turns. Despite these concessions, people opposing the BRT were still not impressed, touting reduced car lanes and "high price tag" for the project. The project as a whole was eventually stalled due to oppositions from motorists, especially from the Fulton Market Association.

The project would advance in three phases, with the first phase running 5.5 miles from Cortland Street to 31st Street.

External links
 Official CTA project website
 BRT Chicago

References

Chicago Transit Authority
Rapid transit in Illinois
Bus transportation in Illinois
Proposed bus rapid transit in the United States
Transportation in Chicago